Anatoly Island (Spanish: Isla Anatoly) is the name of a Venezuelan island in the Canaima National Park. Administratively is part of the municipality Gran Sabana of Bolivar State. The Carrao River, after boarding the Auyantepuy, and being fed by water coming from the Angel Falls, splits in several streams, and forming islands. The biggest island is called Anatoly.

See also
Geography of Venezuela

References

External links
Location map

River islands of Venezuela
Geography of Bolívar (state)